The Junior Kangaroos side represents Australia in the sport of rugby league. They are commonly known as the Junior Kangaroos, after the native marsupial of that name.

Since 2019, they are an under-23 side, with players selected from the NRL. They are administered by the Australian Rugby League Commission.

History
Prior to 2010, the Junior Kangaroos was selected on an under-19 age basis. The best Australian players 19 years of age or younger, would represent the country against the likes of the Junior Kiwis, Papua New Guinea and Tonga, sometimes as curtain raisers to the senior Kangaroos games. Players such as Greg Bird, Matt Bowen, Justin Hodges, Luke Lewis, Jamie Lyon, Cameron Smith and Johnathan Thurston represented the Junior Kangaroos early in their careers and went on to play at the senior level for Australia. The last Junior Kangaroos side selected under the under 19 rules was in 2007. This would be the last Junior Kangaroos team until 2010.

In 2010, with the advent of the National Youth Competition, the Junior Kangaroos was switched to an under-20 team and played in a two Test series against the Junior Kiwis. From 2011 to 2018, the Junior Kangaroos have faced the Junior Kiwis at the end of each season in a one-off Test match, usually as a curtain raiser to a senior level Australia-New Zealand Test match.

In 2019, the ARL announced that Junior Kangaroos would be moving to an under-23 format and would play France at WIN Stadium.

2010 series

1st Test
Played as a curtain raiser to the New Zealand-England Four Nations match.

2nd Test
Played as a curtain raiser to the New Zealand-Papua New Guinea Four Nations match.

2011 match
Played as a curtain raiser to the Australia-New Zealand pre-Four Nations tournament match.
Both coaches agreed to allow an 18th man be used during the match.

2012 match
Played as a curtain raiser to the Australia-New Zealand end of year Test match.

2013 match

2014 match

2015 match
Played as a curtain raiser to the Papua New Guinea-Fiji Melanesian Cup match and the Samoa-Tonga Polynesian Cup match.

2016 match
Played as a curtain raiser to the Papua New Guinea-Fiji Melanesian Cup match and the Samoa-Tonga Polynesian Cup match.

2017 match
Played as a curtain raiser to the 2017 Anzac Test.

2018 match
Played as a curtain raiser to the Australia-New Zealand end of year Test match.

2019 match
Played as a curtain raiser to the Australia-New Zealand Oceania Cup match.

Players

Captains
Ben Jones (2010)
Dale Finucane (2011)
Chad Townsend (2011)
Alex McKinnon (2012)
Mitchell Cornish (2013)
Michael Lichaa (2013)
Cameron McInnes (2014)
Matthew Lodge (2015)
Tevita Pangai Junior (2016)
Brodie Croft (2017)
Jake Clifford (2018)
David Fifita (2019)

Coaches
David Hamilton (2010)
Andrew Patmore (2011)
Kelly Egan (2012–2014)
Justin Holbrook (2015–2017)
Neil Henry (2018–present)

See also

 Australia national rugby league team
 Australian Aboriginal rugby league team

References

 
Junior rugby league
Rugby league representative teams in Australia